Gianfranco Carducci (died) was a Roman Catholic prelate who served as Bishop of Lacedonia (1565–1585).

Biography
On 26 May 1565, Gianfranco Carducci was appointed during the papacy of Pope Pius IV as Bishop of Lacedonia.
He served as Bishop of Lacedonia until his death on 22 February 1584.

References

External links and additional sources
 (for Chronology of Bishops) 
 (for Chronology of Bishops) 

16th-century Italian Roman Catholic bishops
Bishops appointed by Pope Pius IV
1584 deaths